The St. Mary's (Ohio) football program from 1905 to 1909 represented St. Mary's College (later renamed the University of Dayton) in its first five years of intercollegiate football.  The team during these early years was led by four head coaches: William Schoen was the head coach in 1905 and compiled a 0–3 record; J. G. Freshour was the head coach from 1906 to 1907, compiling a 5–5 record; Matthew Hill was the head coach in 1908 and compiled a 7–0–1 record; and George Binlein was the head coach in 1909 and compiled a 4–3 record.

1905

The 1905 St. Mary's (Ohio) football team represented St. Mary's College as an independent during the 1905 college football season. In its first season of college football, the team compiled a 0–3 record. William Schoen was the head coach.

Schedule

1906

The 1906 St. Mary's (Ohio) football team represented St. Mary's College as an independent during the 1906 college football season. In its first season under head coach J. G. Freshour, the team compiled a 5–1 record.

Schedule

1907

The 1907 St. Mary's (Ohio) football team represented St. Mary's College as an independent during the 1907 college football season. In its second and final season under head coach J. G. Freshour, the team compiled a 0–4 record.

Schedule

1908

The 1908 St. Mary's (Ohio) football team represented St. Mary's College as an independent during the 1908 college football season. In its first and only season under head coach Matthew Hill, the team compiled a 7–0–1 record and shut out six of eight opponents.

Schedule

1909

The 1909 St. Mary's (Ohio) football team represented St. Mary's College as an independent during the 1909 college football season. In its first and only season under head coach George Binlein, the team compiled a 4–3 record.

Schedule

References

1905
St. Mary's
St. Mary's
St. Mary's
St. Mary's